The City Rooms is located in the heart of the City of Leicester in England. It has been designated by English Heritage as a Grade I listed building.

History
The building, which was designed by John Johnson in the Greek Revival style, was completed in 1800. It was originally commissioned as Leicester's first hotel but the developer did have enough resources to complete it as such and, in 1799, sold it to a consortium led by the Duke of Rutland, who raised by public subscription the sum of £3,300 still needed to complete it. It opened as the Leicester Assembly Rooms on 17 September 1800 just in time to host the visitors to the Leicester Races held at Victoria Park.

The design for the building involved a symmetrical main frontage of five bays facing the corner of Hotel Street and Market Place South; the central bay featured a porch with paired Tuscan order columns supporting an entablature; there was a large rounded headed window on the first floor flanked by two niches containing female musicians carved by John Charles Felix Rossi and two more large round headed windows beyond that.

In 1817 the building was adapted to become the judges' lodgings; the conversion, which was undertaken by a local builder, Joshua Harrison, took two years to complete and once the building had passed into the ownership of the justices, it became known as the County Rooms. Following the implementation of the Local Government Act 1888, which established county councils in every county, it also became the meeting place of Leicestershire County Council. The building was in high demand and it was even used as a training facility by B Squadron, the Leicestershire Yeomanry at that time.

After County Hall was completed in 1967, the county council had limited use for the building and, after it was sold to Leicester City Council in 1986, it became known as The City Rooms. In 1990 a statue of a Seamstress, sculpted by James Butler, was unveiled outside the building: although not intended to represent any particular person, it served as a reminder of the importance that the hosiery industry once played in Leicester.

After the city council decided to sell the building to a developer, an extensive programme of restoration works intended to convert the building into a hotel with highly decorated meeting rooms, a grand ballroom, a bar and four luxurious bedrooms, was completed in 2005. The Prince of Wales attended a reception in the building, held in support of the Midlands Chapter of the British Asian Trust, on 11 February 2020.

See also
 Grade I listed buildings in Leicester

References

External links 

Grade I listed buildings in Leicestershire
History of Leicester
Hotels in Leicestershire
Buildings and structures in Leicester
Hotel buildings completed in 1800
1800 establishments in England
Buildings and structures completed in 1800